Nina Baanders-Kessler (Leeuwarden, 28 February 1915 – 20 June 2002) was a Dutch sculptor and medalist.

Life and work
Nina Baanders-Kessler was born to Jacob Kessler, butcher in Leeuwarden, and Elizabeth Anna Axe. She was named after her grandmother Kessler-Antje van der Berg, however, she called herself Nina.

In 1934, Nina Kessler admitted to the Royal Academy of Fine Arts, where she studied sculpture in the daytime with Jan Bronner. After her studies she made a trip to Paris and Vienna and settled back in Leeuwarden, where she had her own studio in the Eebuurt neighbourhood. She was the first Frisian sculptor, only twenty years later settled among others Maria van Everdingen and Suze Berkhout Boschma in Friesland. She married in 1942 with Ambrose Baanders, and first lived in Leeuwarden, and later in Vinkeveen.

Works (selection) 
 Before 1941. Weapon stone for City Hall in Koudum
 Before 1941. Weapon stone for Wirdumerpoortsbrug, Leeuwarden
 1947. Plaque of Theo van Welderen Rengers, Oenkerk
 1952. Resistance Memorial (female figure), Makkum
 1955. Tableau for master A.J. Lok, Ravenswoud
 1964. Bust of Johan Bendien, Amsterdam
 Later. Weapon stone Beursbrug, Leeuwarden

References 

1915 births
2002 deaths
People from Leeuwarden
20th-century Dutch sculptors